Street Sports Baseball is a 1987 video game published by Epyx.

Gameplay
Street Sports Baseball is a game in which 16 players of the 52nd Street gang play baseball on an improvised field.

Reception
Rick Teverbaugh reviewed the game for Computer Gaming World, and stated that "Street Sports Baseball is more reminiscent than whimsical, but it is no less fun. Remember the sandlot games where home plate was a garbage can lid and old tree stumps were just part of the hazards of outfield duty? Well, all that and more comes alive in this excellent program."

Reviews
Commodore User - Sep, 1987
Computer and Video Games - Oct, 1987
All Game Guide - 1998
Happy Computer #4

References

External links
Review in Compute!
Review in Compute!'s Gazette
Review in Info
Review in Drean Commodore (Spanish)
Review in Commodore Magazine
Review in Zzap!
Review in Zzap! (Italian edition)
Review in RUN magazine
Review in Commodore Computing International
Review in Your Computer
Review in Compute!'s Gazette

1987 video games
Apple II games
Baseball video games
Commodore 64 games
DOS games
Epyx games
Video games developed in the United States